Tubular Bells for Two is a music-theatre production created and performed by Australian multi-instrumentalists Aidan Roberts and Daniel Holdsworth. In the show the two musicians re-create Mike Oldfield's 1973 album Tubular Bells live with over twenty instruments. They won The Sydney Fringe award for 'Best Musical Moment' in 2010, and have since featured at major arts festivals around Australia and the Pacific, including Sydney Festival and NZ International Arts Festival. The production made its European début at the 2012 Edinburgh Festival Fringe where it won two awards, going on to tour Europe in 2013 for the 40th anniversary of the original Oldfield album. The production has gone on to regularly tour the US, Europe, Australia and New Zealand.

In July 2017, it was announced that Aidan Roberts would be stepping down from touring the show, and a new member, Tom Bamford, would join the production. Bamford has since toured the UK and Australia receiving high praise after stepping in to such a demanding role.

History

Long-time friends and collaborators, Roberts and Holdsworth, conceived the show 'almost by accident' whilst listening to records around a fire during the Australian winter of 2008. After listening to the original Oldfield classic, the two decided to try to play the album from start-to-finish on two guitars. According to Michael Dwyer, "Performing the album was furthest from their minds. But week by week, as Roberts' living room slowly filled to bursting with dozens of instruments, the bells of destiny became impossible to ignore." Eventually they were attempting to re-create Tubular Bells note-for-note on over twenty instruments between the two of them, and finally, after 9 months of rehearsal, they decided to perform it.

The duo contacted The Clarendon in Katoomba NSW, Australia, and asked for a 'quiet night', because they did not think the performance would have much appeal. They were given the night of Good Friday, 2009, and to their surprise the show sold-out. This led to an invitation to the Sydney Fringe Festival in 2010 where the show received a Sydney Fringe Award for Best Musical Moment.

The pair have since gone on to perform sell-out seasons at the Victorian Arts Centre in 2011, Darwin Festival 2011, Sydney Festival 2012 and the New Zealand International Arts Festival 2012.

Tubular Bells for Two was performed at the 2012 Edinburgh Festival Fringe where the show won a Herald Angel Award and a Sixth Star Bobby Award.

During 2013 the show toured Australia, New Zealand and Europe to commemorate the 40th anniversary of the original Oldfield album. In 2014 there was an extensive tour of The Netherlands, and in 2015 it toured the US, Iceland and parts of Australia.

At the Adelaide Fringe in 2015, the show was garnered with two awards, winning a Weekly Award, and the BankSA Adelaide Fringe Award for Best Music.

DVD
A performance of Tubular Bells for Two was filmed during the Sydney Festival 2012 at the Parramatta Riverside Theatres. The film was directed and edited by Daniel Jameison, and was released on DVD in July 2012 through Birdland Records.

Awards

Instruments and equipment
The following is a list of instruments and equipment used by the performers in the show:

Daniel Holdsworth
 Fender Thinline Telecaster electric guitar
 Gibson SG electric guitar
 Alhambra classical guitar
 Roland SH-201 synthesizer
 Piano
 Glockenspiel
 Drum kit
 Vocals
 Tin Whistle
 Kazoo
 Nord Electro organ
 Hofner bass guitar
 Line 6 M13 looper
 Boss DS-1 distortion pedal
 Boss PH-3 phaser pedal
 Artec Blues Overdrive pedal
 Artec Analog Delay pedal
 iPad with Audio Sampler
 2 x Fender Hot Rod DeVille amplifiers
 Tubular bells

Aidan Roberts / Tom Bamford
 Fender Jazzmaster electric guitar
 Piano
 Nord Electro organ
 Epiphone acoustic guitar
 Hofner bass guitar
 Glockenspiel
 Drum kit
 Bodhran
 Vocals
 Kazoo
 Line 6 M13 looper
 Boss OC-3 Super Octave pedal
 Ibanez Tube Screamer pedal
 2 x Fender Hot Rod DeVille amplifiers
 Tubular bells

References

External links 
 Official Tubular Bells for Two website
 Tubular Bells for Two on Facebook
 Tubular Bells for Two on Twitter
 Interview with Daniel Holdsworth & Aidan Roberts for Sydney Festival 2012

Australian musicians
Australian musical duos
Mike Oldfield
Musical groups established in 2008